The Homeless World Cup is an annual association football tournament organized by the Homeless World Cup Foundation, a social organization which advocates the end of homelessness through the sport of association football. The organization puts together an annual football tournament where teams of homeless people from various country compete.

The tournament was first held in 2001, and in 2008 it added a women's competition. From 2010 onwards, all tournaments have featured both men's and women's teams.

History

The Homeless World Cup organization was co-founded by Mel Young and Harald Schmied in 2001 to advocate for a global solution to homelessness. The first annual football tournament for homeless people took place in 2003 in Graz, Austria. Host cities since then have included Gothenburg, Edinburgh, Copenhagen, Cape Town, Melbourne, Milan, Rio de Janeiro, Paris, Mexico City, Poznań, Santiago, Amsterdam, Glasgow, Oslo and Mexico City. Most recently, the 2019 edition was hosted by Wales in Bute Park, Cardiff, with Michael Sheen opening the tournament.

The 2020 tournament had been due to take place in Tampere, Finland, but was cancelled as a result of the COVID-19 pandemic.

The international headquarters of the Homeless World Cup is located at Easter Road Stadium in Edinburgh, Scotland.

National partners
The Homeless World Cup organization operates through a network of more than 70 national partners around the world, supporting football programs and social enterprise development.

|}

Format

Fields 
Since 2015 the tournament has been played on synthetic turf fields from Act Global.

Rules

Player eligibility
Players must meet all of the following criteria:
Be at least 16 years old at the time of the tournament
Have not taken part in previous Homeless World Cup tournaments
Also, must be any of the following:
Have been homeless at some point after the previous year's tournament in accordance with the national definition of homelessness
Make their main living income as a streetpaper vendor
Be asylum seekers currently without positive asylum status or who were previously asylum seekers but obtained residency status a year before the event
Currently be in drug or alcohol rehabilitation and also have been homeless at some point in the past two years

Participants
A maximum of 4 players per team on the court:
 3 outfield players,
 1 goalkeeper,
 Plus 4 substitution players (rolling substitution allowed)

Tournament details
The winning team gets 3 points. The losing team gets zero points. If a match ends in a draw, it is decided by sudden-death penalty shootout and the winning team gets two points and the losing team gets one point. Games are 14 minutes long, in two seven-minute halves.
The field measures 22m long x 16m wide.

Results

Men

Participating nations

Women

Participating nations

Performance by country

Men

Women

Media coverage
Journalist Rick Reilly said "Homeless soccer turned out to be one of the best things I've covered in all my years.
Seeing these people finally getting cheered, finally feeling some self-worth, was great.
It was great to see these guys caring about something other than booze or where they're going to find food or where they're going to sleep - just getting to be regular people for once."

Several TV documentaries have been made tracking the participation of teams from homelessness to participating at the annual event.

In 2011, a 90-minute documentary called Hors-Jeu: Carton rouge contre l’exclusion was broadcast by Canal+ and focused on the Paris 2011 Homeless World Cup and Homeless World Cup itself and five national partners: Japan, Argentina, Palestine, France and Kenya. It was aired in France on 9 October 2011. The documentary was directed by Jérôme Mignard and Thomas Risch.

The 2006 Homeless World Cup was the subject of a documentary entitled Kicking It. directed by Susan Koch and Jeff Werner focusing on the experiences of seven homeless people at the Homeless World Cup football (soccer) game in South Africa. Featured in the documentary, narrated by actor Colin Farrell were residents of Afghanistan; Kenya; Dublin, Ireland; Charlotte, North Carolina, U.S.; Madrid, Spain and St. Petersburg in Russia. The film premiered in January, 2008 at the Sundance Film Festival, distributed by Liberation Entertainment, Netflix and ESPN.

References

External links

Official website
Rankings Homeless World Cup
The Rules for the annual football tournament

 
Homeless sport
Non-FIFA football competitions
Annual sporting events
Street football
World championships in association football
Recurring sporting events established in 2001